WYNR (102.5 FM) is a radio station broadcasting a country music format. Licensed to Waycross, Georgia, United States, the station serves the Brunswick, Georgia/Jacksonville, Florida area.  The station is currently owned by iHeartMedia, Inc., through licensee iHM Licenses, LLC.

History
The station was assigned the call sign WQCW on September 19, 1983.  On December 31, 1986, the station changed its call sign to WAYX-FM; on November 1, 1987, to WBGA and on October 8, 2002, to the current WYNR.

On May 15, 2014, Qantum Communications announced that it would sell its 29 stations, including WYNR, to Clear Channel Communications (now iHeartMedia), in a transaction connected to Clear Channel's sale of WALK AM-FM in Patchogue, New York to Connoisseur Media via Qantum. The transaction was consummated on September 9, 2014.

References

External links

YNR
Country radio stations in the United States
Radio stations established in 1983
IHeartMedia radio stations